State Road 377 (NM 377) is a  state highway in the US state of New Mexico. NM 377's western terminus is at NM 549 east of Deming, and the eastern terminus is at the end of state maintenance at the east end of the bridge over the Mimbres River east of Deming.

History
The portion from the Mimbres River bridge eastward was transferred to Luna County on August 19, 1999.

Major intersections

See also

References

377
Transportation in Luna County, New Mexico